So You Think You Can Dance, a televised American dance competition, began broadcast of its tenth season on May 14, 2013.  It airs on the FOX Television Network and was hosted by Cat Deeley and featured returning permanent judges Nigel Lythgoe, who also serves as one of the show's executive producers, and Mary Murphy. The show featured many of the format changes instituted in the previous season, including notably a single episode per week/voting round (seasons two through eight featured two episodes per week). It was also the first season in the show's history that a tap dancer not only made it past the third week of competition, but made the finale. It is also the first season to last longer than nine weeks. Lythgoe announced in the finale that the show has been renewed for the eleventh season.

Auditions

Open auditions for season 10 were held in the following locations:

Las Vegas Week
The Las Vegas callbacks were held at the Planet Hollywood Resort and Casino in Paradise, Nevada. Contestants had to learn and perform various styles of choreography with cuts being made after every round. By the end of the week, only 33 dancers remained to be selected for the Top 20.

* Only participated on the judge's panel on the round they choreographed.

** Brought in as special guest judges.

Finals

Top 20 Finalists
Contestants' dance styles and hometowns are based on those listed on the official website.

Female Contestants

Male Contestants

Elimination chart

* Due to Tucker Knox being injured on August 6, he was automatically placed in the Bottom 4 for the next show.

Performances

Meet the Top 20 (June 18, 2013)
 Judges: Nigel Lythgoe, Mary Murphy, Adam Shankman
 Performances:

*Emilio Dosal, a hip-hop dancer, was originally selected in the Top 20. Shortly after, he sustained an injury forcing him to withdraw from the competition. Aaron Turner, number 11 in the list of male dancers, took his place in the Top 20 finalists.

Week 1 (June 25, 2013)
Group dance: "Puttin' on the Ritz"—Herb Alpert feat. Lani Hall (Jazz-Funk; Choreographers: Tabitha and Napoleon D'umo)
Judges: Nigel Lythgoe, Mary Murphy, Wayne Brady
 Performances:

Week 2 (July 2, 2013)
Group dance: "The Heroic Weather Conditions of the Universe Part 1 – A Veiled Mist" from Moonrise Kingdom (Contemporary, Choreographer: Tyce Diorio)
Judges: Nigel Lythgoe, Mary Murphy, Christina Applegate
Solos:

 Performances:
Due to the format change, the contestants who were already eliminated will still be dancing providing their partner is still in the competition.

Week 3 (July 9, 2013)
Group dance: "Pretty Face" (Nathan Lanier remix)—Sóley (Jazz Choreographers: Christopher Scott & Sonya Tayeh)
Judges: Nigel Lythgoe, Mary Murphy, Paula Abdul, Erin Andrews
Solos:

* Due to a meniscus injury, Jade Zuberi withdrew from the competition. Marko Germar (who was not a competitor on the show) danced in his place with Zuberi's partner Malece Miller.

Week 4 (July 23, 2013)
Group dance: "New World"—The Irrepressibles (Contemporary; Choreographers: Stacey Tookey and Peter Chu)
Judges: Nigel Lythgoe, Mary Murphy, Carly Rae Jepsen
Solos:

Week 5 (July 30, 2013)
Group dance: "Dimman Kryper Sakta In"—District 78 (Jazz/Ballroom; Choreographers: Dmitry Chaplin and Sonya Tayeh)
Judges: Nigel Lythgoe, Mary Murphy, Anna Kendrick
Solos: 

* Curtis Holland injured his shoulder during rehearsal and couldn't perform on the show. Leonardo Barrionuevo (who was a choreographer on the show) danced in his place with Holland's partner Hayley Erbert.

Week 6 (August 6, 2013)
Group dance: "Pandeyjee Seeti" from Dabangg 2 (Bollywood; Choreographer: Nakul Dev Mahajan)
Judges: Nigel Lythgoe, Mary Murphy, Kenny Ortega
Solos:

* Due to a knee infection, Tucker Knox was unable to perform. Alex Wong (Season 7 contestant) danced in his place with Knox's partner Jenna Johnson.

Week 7 (August 13, 2013)
Group dance: "The Gravel Road" from The Village (Contemporary; Choreographer: Christopher Scott)
Judges: Nigel Lythgoe, Mary Murphy, Debbie Allen

Week 8 (August 20, 2013)
Group dance: "Move to the Ocean" (Baauer remix)—Brick & Mortar (Contemporary; Choreographer: Mia Michaels)
Judges: Nigel Lythgoe, Mary Murphy, Jenna Elfman
Solos:

This week, each routine is choreographed by the all-star who's paired with the contestant.

Week 9 (August 27, 2013)
Group dance: "Hlohonolofatsa"—Soweto Gospel Choir (African Jazz; Choreographer: Sean Cheesman)
Judges: Nigel Lythgoe, Mary Murphy, Jesse Tyler Ferguson
Solos:

Week 10 (September 3, 2013)
Judges: Nigel Lythgoe, Mary Murphy, Gabby Douglas, Paula Abdul
Solos:

Week 11 (Finale) (September 10, 2013)
Judges: Nigel Lythgoe, Mary Murphy, Paula Abdul, Adam Shankman, Stephen "twitch" Boss
Group dances & guest performers:

Judges & finalists' picks

All-Stars Dance Pool

 This dancer was eliminated this week.
 This dancer was in the bottom 4 this week.
 These two dancers won the competition.

Ratings

U.S. Nielsen ratings

See also
 List of So You Think You Can Dance finalists

References

External links
   Official "So You Think You Can Dance"   Website

2013 American television seasons
Season 10